The Indianapolis mayoral election of 1963 took place on November 5, 1963 and saw the election of John J. Barton.

Barton won a hotly contested Democratic primary. Barton defeated Republican Clarence Drayer and independent candidate Samuel Unger in the general election.

Barton's campaign platform promised to reform the Indianapolis Police Department, involve the community in decision making, seek federal assistance for Indianapolis whenever possible, practice slum clearance, and make infrastructure repairs.

Results
Voter turnout saw then-record levels.

References

1963
1963 United States mayoral elections
1963 Indiana elections